Baron Grey of Ruthin (or Ruthyn) was a noble title created in the Peerage of England by writ of summons in 1324 for Sir Roger de Grey, a son of John, 2nd Baron Grey of Wilton, and has been in abeyance since 1963. Historically, this branch of the Grey family was seated at Ruthin Castle in Wales.

The Bearers of the Great Golden Spurs, or Saint George's Spurs, the emblems of knighthood and chivalry, perform their service jure sanguinis, dependent upon descent from William, Earl of Pembroke, heir to his brother, John le Marshal, who carried the Spurs at the Coronation of Richard I in 1189. The Marshals failed in the male line and the hereditary right descended in the female line through the Hastings family to the Lords Grey de Ruthyn, later Marquesses of Hastings. The male line failed again and an equal right in the female line descended in 1911 to the Earl of Loudoun (Abney-Hastings) and Lord Grey de Ruthyn (Clifton).

Barons Grey of Ruthin (1324)
Roger Grey, 1st Baron Grey of Ruthin (d. 1353)
Reynold Grey, 2nd Baron Grey of Ruthin (1319–1388)
Reynold Grey, 3rd Baron Grey of Ruthin (1362–1440)
Edmund Grey, 4th Baron Grey of Ruthin, 1st Earl of Kent (1416–1490)
George Grey, 5th Baron Grey of Ruthin, 2nd Earl of Kent (d. 1503)
Richard Grey, 6th Baron Grey of Ruthin, 3rd Earl of Kent (1478–1523)
Henry Grey, 7th Baron Grey of Ruthin, 4th Earl of Kent (d. 1562)
Reginald Grey, 8th Baron Grey of Ruthin, 5th Earl of Kent (d. 1573)
Henry Grey, 9th Baron Grey of Ruthin, 6th Earl of Kent (1541–1615)
Charles Grey, 10th Baron Grey of Ruthin, 7th Earl of Kent (1545–1623)
Henry Grey, 11th Baron Grey of Ruthin, 8th Earl of Kent (1583–1639)
Charles Longueville, 12th Baron Grey of Ruthin (1612–1643)
Susan Longueville, 13th Baroness Grey of Ruthin (1634–1676)
Charles Yelverton, 14th Baron Grey of Ruthin (1657–1679)
Henry Yelverton, 15th Baron Grey of Ruthin, 1st Viscount Longueville (1664–1704)
Talbot Yelverton, 16th Baron Grey of Ruthin, 1st Earl of Sussex (1690–1731)
George Augustus Yelverton, 17th Grey of Ruthin, 2nd Earl of Sussex (1727–1758)
Henry Yelverton, 18th Baron Grey of Ruthin, 3rd Earl of Sussex (1728–1799)
Henry Edward Yelverton, 19th Baron Grey de Ruthyn (1780–1810)
Barbara Yelverton, 20th Baroness Grey of Ruthin (1810–1858)
Henry Weysford Charles Plantagenet Rawdon-Hastings, 21st Baron Grey of Ruthin, 4th Marquess of Hastings (1842–1868) (abeyant 1868)
Bertha Lelgarde Clifton, 22nd Baroness Grey de Ruthyn (1835–1887) (abeyance terminated 1885)
Rawdon George Grey Clifton, 23rd Baron Grey de Ruthyn (1858–1912)
Cecil Talbot Clifton, 24th Baron Grey de Ruthyn (9 January 1862 – 21 May 1934) (abeyant 1934)
John Lancelot Wykeham Butler-Bowdon, 25th Baron Grey de Ruthyn (1883–1963) (abeyance terminated 1940, abeyant 1963)

Co-heirs 
All descent from the 22nd Baroness' three sisters:
Simon Abney-Hastings, 15th Earl of Loudoun (b. 1974)
Sheena Wakefield (b. 1941)
Flora Ann Madeline Hubble (b. 1957)
Robert Fresnes, 14th Baron de Fresnes (b. 1970)
Norman Angus MacLaren (b. 1948)
Rhodri Philipps, 4th Viscount St Davids (b. 1966)
Paul Lubienski Bodenham (b. 1965)
Julian Marsham, 8th Earl of Romney (b. 1948)

Notes 

1324 establishments in England
Baronies by writ
Grey family
Noble titles created in 1324
Abeyant baronies in the Peerage of England